The Al Ain Classic Car Museum is an automotive museum in the United Arab Emirates, dedicated to the display of classic and heritage cars. It is located in the city of Al Ain near Jebel Hafeet.

The museum
The museum started as a small collection of personal and Abu Dhabi Classic Car Club member cars in 2009. The car collection has over 30 cars.

Museum collection
The museum includes examples of the following cars:

Ford Model A
Chevrolet Series 490
MG J-type Midget
Ford Model T
Honda CB175
Honda ATC250R
Audi Quattro
Audi Coupé (B2)
Ford Mustang (first generation)
Chevrolet Corvette (C3)
Chevrolet C/K
Chevrolet Camaro (third generation)
Dodge Charger (B-body)
Toyota Land Cruiser (J40)
Land Rover Series I, II, IIa and III
Mercedes W108
Mercedes-Benz W111
Mercedes-Benz 450SEL 6.9
Mercedes-Benz R107 and C107
Plymouth Fury
Range Rover Classic
Suzuki Jimny LJ10
Volkswagen Beetle
General Lee (car)
Dodge Super Bee

References

External links
Al Ain Classic Car Museum website

2009 establishments in the United Arab Emirates
Museums established in 2009
Museums in Al Ain
Automobile museums in the United Arab Emirates